City of Valla is a 1981 role-playing game supplement published by John Scott Clegg.

Contents
City of Valla is a supplement in which a two-map set depicts the city of Valla.

Publication history
City of Valla was written and published by John Scott Clegg in 1981 as two large three-color maps.

Reception
Jackie Selck reviewed City of Valla for Different Worlds magazine and stated that "Even without the guidebook, the city is a fascinating addition to my collection. It is worth far more than what the publisher is charging for it."

References

Fantasy role-playing game supplements
Role-playing game supplements introduced in 1981